Kenneth F. Galloway, Sr. is an American engineer and engineering educator. He is a Distinguished Professor of Engineering, Emeritus, and Dean of the School of Engineering, Emeritus, at Vanderbilt University. He is a Fellow of the Institute of Electrical and Electronics Engineers, the American Association for the Advancement of Science, the American Society for Engineering Education and the American Physical Society.

An alumnus of Vanderbilt, he earned his doctorate from the University of South Carolina and went on to hold professional appointments at Indiana University, NAVSEA-Crane, the National Institute of Standards and Technology, the University of Maryland, and the University of Arizona before returning to Vanderbilt as Dean of the School of Engineering in 1996. He served as Dean of Engineering until 2012.

His research and teaching activities have been in solid-state devices, semiconductor technology, and radiation effects in electronics. He has published numerous technical papers in these areas and has conducted research sponsored by several U.S. government organizations.

References

Year of birth missing (living people)
Living people
Vanderbilt University faculty
21st-century American engineers
University of South Carolina alumni
Vanderbilt University alumni
Fellow Members of the IEEE
Fellows of the American Association for the Advancement of Science
Fellows of the American Society for Engineering Education
Fellows of the American Physical Society